Jonas Petter Berggren (born 21 March 1967) is a Swedish musician and singer-songwriter and record producer, also known as Joker. He started writing songs when he was seven, and continues to write for the Swedish band Ace of Base, which he is a founding member of, as well as other bands. He was born in Gothenburg, Sweden.

Biography

Early life 
Jonas Petter Berggren was the first child of three siblings, his younger sisters are Linn and Jenny. Jonas was born with a cleft lip, undergoing three surgeries within his first year. He became interested in music when he was 10, after his father started teaching him to play the guitar.

Career 
As the founding member of Ace of Base, Berggren has written all of their biggest hits, including "All That She Wants", "The Sign", and "Beautiful Life". He also plays the guitar and keyboards. Working under the artist name of "Joker" (or, in some later works, JP), Berggren nowadays also has his own studio, called The Barn. The former female members of Ace of Base, Linn and Jenny Berggren, are his sisters. He also worked with DJ Bobo, Army of Lovers, E-Type and Meja.

Jonas was also the producer and composer for the album Pride by Swedish pop group Yaki-Da, in 1995.

Writing for Ace of Base
Berggren has contributed to writing all Ace of Base's material, except the following:

"Don't Turn Around" (Cover: Diane Warren & Albert Hammond)
"Edge of Heaven" (Ulf, John Ballard, & StoneStream)
"Strange Ways" (Malin)
"Ravine" (Jenny)
"Perfect World" (Ulf, John Ballard, & StoneStream)
"Whispers in Blindness" (Malin)
"Wave Wet Sand" (Jenny)
"Que Sera" (Ulf, John Ballard, & StoneStream)
"Just 'N' Image" (Malin)
"Experience Pearls" (Jenny)
"Mercy Mercy" (Ulf and John Ballard)
"He Decides" (Jenny)
"Everytime It Rains" (B. Steinberg, R. Nowels, M. Vidal)
"I Pray" (Ulf and John Ballard)
"Don't Go Away" (Ulf and John Ballard)
"Cruel Summer" (Cover: S. Dallin, S. Fahey, S. Jolley, A. Swain & K. Woodward)
"Wonderful Life" (Cover: Black)
"Juliet" (Cover; Henry Bergström & Peter Bergström)

Personal life
He married Norwegian hairdresser Birthe Haugland on 12 July 2000 whom he met during a cruise in Norway in the summer of 1996. Together they have four children: Julia, born in 1999, Gabriel, born in 2001, Amanda, born in 2006, and Molly, born in 2008.

References

External links
 Ace of Base official website
 

1967 births
Living people
Musicians from Gothenburg
Ace of Base members
Swedish guitarists
Male guitarists
Swedish keyboardists
Swedish songwriters
Swedish male musicians